Piet Taljaard (April 1914 – 8 March 1950) was a South African weightlifter. He competed in the men's heavyweight event at the 1948 Summer Olympics.

References

1914 births
1950 deaths
South African male weightlifters
Olympic weightlifters of South Africa
Weightlifters at the 1948 Summer Olympics
Sportspeople from Cape Town